Allen Crowder (born November 8, 1989) is a retired American mixed martial artist who competed in the heavyweight division of the Ultimate Fighting Championship (UFC).

Background

Allen Crowder's nickname "Pretty Boy" comes from his amateur career. Prior to his second amateur fight, his opponent told him he was "too pretty to fight". Crowder knocked him out in the first round.

Mixed martial arts career

Early career
Allen Crowder had an early career record of 8 wins, 2 losses and 1 no contest. He was invited to participate in Dana White's Contender Series 8 of Dana White's Contender Series. Crowder faced Don'Tale Mayes, winning by technical knockout in the third round. He was offered a contract to fight in the UFC after the fight.

Ultimate Fighting Championship
Crowder made his UFC debut on December 2, 2017 at UFC 218 against Justin Willis. He lost the fight by KO in the first round.

Crowder faced former NFL player Greg Hardy next at UFC Fight Night 143 and won the fight by way of disqualification after Hardy landed an illegal knee strike in the second round.

At UFC Fight Night 154, Crowder fought Jairzinho Rozenstruik and lost the fight in 9 seconds by way of knockout. At the time, this was the second fastest knockout in the UFC heavyweight division.

In November 2019, he announced his retirement from MMA, citing memory issues from sustaining concussions in his last three fights.

Mixed martial arts record

|Loss
|align=center|10–4 (1)
|Jairzinho Rozenstruik
|KO (punches)
|UFC Fight Night: Moicano vs. The Korean Zombie 
|
|align=center|1
|align=center|0:09
|Greenville, South Carolina, United States
|
|-
| Win
| align=center| 10–3 (1)
| Greg Hardy
| DQ (illegal knee)
| UFC Fight Night: Cejudo vs. Dillashaw
| 
| align=center| 2
| align=center| 2:28
| Brooklyn, New York, United States
|
|-
| Loss
| align=center| 9–3 (1)
| Justin Willis
| KO (punches)
| UFC 218
| 
| align=center| 1
| align=center| 2:33
| Detroit, Michigan, United States
|
|-
| Win
| align=center| 9–2 (1)
| Don'Tale Mayes
| TKO (punches and elbows)
| Dana White's Contender Series 8
| 
| align=center| 3
| align=center| 4:12
| Las Vegas, Nevada, United States
|
|-
| Win
| align=center| 8–2 (1)
| Robert Neal
| TKO (punches)
| Bellator Monster Energy Fight Series: Charlotte
| 
| align=center| 1
| align=center| 2:24
| Charlotte, North Carolina, United States
|
|-
| Win
| align=center| 7–2 (1)
| Chase Gamble
| TKO (slam)
| NLFC - Next Level Fight Club 6
| 
| align=center| 1
| align=center| 4:43
| Raleigh, North Carolina, United States
|
|-
| Win
| align=center| 6–2 (1)
| Keith Bell
| TKO (punches)
| NLFC - Next Level Fight Club 5
| 
| align=center| 1
| align=center| 0:16
| Raleigh, North Carolina, United States
|
|-
| NC
| align=center| 5–2 (1)
| Lorenzo Hood
| NC (accidental eye poke)
| NLFC - Next Level Fight Club 4
| 
| align=center| 1
| align=center| 2:13
| Raleigh, North Carolina, United States
|
|-
| Loss
| align=center| 5–2
| Ryan Pokryfky
| TKO (punches)
| Camp Lejeune - For The Leathernecks 4
| 
| align=center| 3
| align=center| 3:42
| Jacksonville, North Carolina, United States
|
|-
| Loss
| align=center| 5–1
| Curtis Blaydes
| TKO (punches)
| RDMMA - Battle in the South 10
| 
| align=center| 2
| align=center| N/A
| Wilmington, North Carolina, United States
|
|-
| Win
| align=center| 5–0
| William Baptiste
| TKO (cut)
| NLFC - Next Level Fight Club 1
| 
| align=center| 1
| align=center| 5:00
| Greenville, North Carolina, United States
|
|-
| Win
| align=center| 4–0
| Tomar Washington
| Submission (rear-naked choke)
| Warfare 13 - Dawn of the Strikers
| 
| align=center| 2
| align=center| 2:30
| North Myrtle Beach, South Carolina, United States
|
|-
| Win
| align=center| 3–0
| Arnold Adams
| Decision (unanimous)
| RDMMA - Battle In The South 9
| 
| align=center| 3
| align=center| 4:00
| Wilmington, North Carolina, United States
|
|-
| Win
| align=center| 2–0
| Arnold Adams
| Submission (choke)
| RDMMA - Battle In The South 8
| 
| align=center| 2
| align=center| 0:31
| Wilmington, North Carolina, United States
|
|-
| Win
| align=center| 1–0
| Gil Isabel
| Submission (guillotine choke)
| ROC 47 - Ring of Combat 47
| 
| align=center| 2
| align=center| 0:15
| Atlantic City, New Jersey, United States
|

References

External links
 

Living people

Heavyweight mixed martial artists

1989 births
American male mixed martial artists
Ultimate Fighting Championship male fighters